The Pârâul Primejdios is a right tributary of the river Cașin in Romania. It flows into the Cașin near Iacobeni.

References

Rivers of Romania
Rivers of Harghita County